Elmer is a name of Germanic British origin. The given name originated as a surname, a medieval variant of the given name Aylmer, derived from Old English æþel (noble) and mær (famous).  It was adopted as a given name in the United States, "in honor of the popularity of the brothers Ebenezer and Jonathan Elmer, leading supporters of the American Revolution." The name has declined in popularity since the first decades of the 20th century and fell out of the top 1,000 names used for American boys in 2009. However, it continues in use for newborn boys in the United States, where 154 boys born there in 2021 received the name. The name is common in the United States and Canada.

Notable people with the name include:

Mononym 

 Eilmer of Malmesbury (or Elmer), 11th-century English Benedictine monk
 In the amateur radio subculture, an Elmer is a mentor to a newcoming amateur radio operator

Given name 
 Elmer L. Andersen (1909–2004), American businessman, philanthropist, and the 30th governor of Minnesota
 Elmer Bernstein (1922–2004), American composer
 Elmer Bischoff (1916–1991), American painter
 W. Elmer Brandon (1906–1956), Canadian politician, known by his middle name
 Elmer Davis (1890–1958), news reporter, author, director of the United States Office of War Information during World War II
 Elmer Dessens (born 1971), major league baseball relief pitcher
 Elmer Diktonius (1896–1961), Finnish writer and composer
 Elmer E. Ellsworth (1837–1861), lawyer and soldier, and the first conspicuous casualty of the American Civil War
 Elmer Flick (1876–1971), American hall-of-fame baseball player
 Elemér Gorondy-Novák (1885–1954), Hungarian military officer, who served as commander of the Hungarian Third Army during the Second World War, leader of Hungarian forces during Invasion of Yugoslavia
 Elmer Gedeon (1917–1944), American baseball player
 Elmer Grey (1872–1963), American architect and artist
 Elmer E. Hall,  brigadier general in the United States Marine Corps
 Elmer Beseler Harris (1939–2019), American businessman and politician
 Elmer Cameron Hawley (1905–1969), American novelist
 Elmer Keith (1899–1984), American firearms cartridge designer and author
 Elmer Kelton (1926–2009), American journalist and writer, particularly of Western novels
 Elmer Lach (1918–2015), Canadian ice hockey player
 Elmer Layden (1903–1973), commissioner of the National Football League and head football coach at the University of Notre Dame
 Elmer MacKay (born 1936), Canadian politician
 Elmer McCurdy (1880–1911), American outlaw whose corpse was put on exhibit
 Elmer Drew Merrill (1876–1956), American botanist
Elmer "Geronimo" Pratt, (1947–2011) Vietnam veteran and high-ranking member of the Black Panther Party
 Elmer Rees (1941–2019), Welsh mathematician
 Elmer Rice (1892–1967), American playwright
 Elmer Riddle (1914–1984), baseball player for the Cincinnati Reds
 Elmer Snowden (1900–1973), American jazz musician
 Elmer Ambrose Sperry (1860–1930), American inventor and entrepreneur
 Elmer Steele (1886–1966), American baseball player
 Elmer Valo (1921–1998), major league baseball player, coach, and scout
Uncle Elmer, American wrestler, born Stanley Fraizer

Surname 
Adolph Daniel Edward Elmer (1870–1942), American botanist
Birger Elmér (1919–1999), head of the Swedish secret intelligence agency, known as IB (1965–1975)
Charles Elmer (1872–1954), American amateur astronomer, co-founder of the Perkin-Elmer optical company
Ebenezer Elmer (1752–1843), American politician and physician
Edwin Romanzo Elmer (1850–1923), American painter
Emma Osterman Elmer (1867–1956), American librarian and author
Greg Elmer (born 1967), British-born Professor of Professional Communication at Ryerson University
James Elmer (born 1971), Australian Olympic field hockey striker
James C. Elmer (1882–1920), American college football player
John Elmer (footballer) (1905–1993), Australian rules footballer
Jonas Elmer (director) (born 1966), Danish film director, screenwriter and actor
Jonas Elmer (born 1988), Swiss footballer
Jonathan Elmer (1745–1817), American politician
Kenneth Elmer (born 1948), Canadian Olympic middle-distance runner
Lachlan Elmer (born 1969), Australian Olympic field hockey player
Lucius Elmer (1793–1883), American Democratic politician, U.S. Representative from New Jersey (1843–1845)
Philip Elmer-DeWitt (born 1949), American computer journalist
Rico Elmer (born 1969), Swiss ski mountaineer and mountain runner
Rudolf Elmer, whistleblower who released documents about Swiss bank Julius Bär
Stephen Elmer (baptised 1715–1796), English painter
Terri-Rae Elmer (born 1956), Los Angeles radio broadcaster
Wally Elmer (1898–1978), Canadian ice hockey player
William Elmer (1869–1945), American silent film actor
William P. Elmer (1871–1956), U.S. Representative from Missouri (1943–1945)

Fictional characters
 Elmer the Patchwork Elephant, the title character in a series of children's picture books by David McKee
 Elmer, a comic book by Gerry Alanguilan
 Elmer, a fictional bull, "husband" of Elsie the Cow
 Elmer, a character from The Fairly OddParents
 Elmer Fudd, a Looney Tunes character
 Elmer Elephant, the titular character of a Disney Silly Symphonies short
 Elmer Gantry, the title character in a novel by Sinclair Lewis
 Elmer C. Albatross, in the Baccano! light novel series
 Elmer, the ventriloquist dummy used by Western film actor Max Terhune
 Elmer, on Pappyland
 Elmer Phitts, a character in the Brandon Rogers Cinematic Universe

See also 
 
Aylmer, a surname

Notes 

Masculine given names
English masculine given names